Krasny Yar (Qıźılyar) is a rural locality (a village) in Kugarchinsky Selsoviet, Kugarchinsky District, Bashkortostan, Russia. The population was 26 as of 2010. There is 1 street.

Geography 
Krasny Yar is located 31 km south of Mrakovo (the district's administrative centre) by road. Mukachevo is the nearest rural locality.

References 

Rural localities in Kugarchinsky District